Cynthia Maddox (born 1940) is an American model who is best known for appearing on the cover of Playboy magazine five times in the early to mid-1960s, though she was never a playmate.

Initially working as a receptionist and secretary at Playboy's headquarters in Chicago, Maddox rose to the position of assistant cartoon editor at the magazine.  She dated Hugh Hefner in the early 1960s but chose to leave him when he decided that he did not want to marry her.

Maddox attended Wright Junior College, in Chicago, Illinois, at least for the semester January 1959 - June 1959.she went on to attend University of Chicago.

References

1941 births
Living people
American female models
Playboy people
Place of birth missing (living people)
21st-century American women